The Iraq national under-23 football team  (also known as Iraq Olympic football team) represents Iraq in international under-23 football, Olympic Games and at the Asian Games, The team is controlled by the governing body for football in Iraq, Iraq Football Association (IFA).

Iraq reached fourth place in the 2004 Olympic Games in Athens and were champions in the 2013 AFC U-22 Championship. Other achievements include silver medal in the 2006 Asian Games in Doha, and the bronze medal in the 2014 Asian Games in Incheon.

History

Summer Olympics

2004 Athens Olympics

After 16 years without participation, Iraq qualified for the 2004 Summer Olympics after winning the 2004 Olympic Asian Qualifiers under head coach Adnan Hamad and were scheduled to play against Costa Rica, Morocco and Portugal in the group stages. At the Olympics Iraq started with a shocking 4–2 win against Portugal. That was followed by a 2–0 win against Costa Rica and a 2–1 loss to Morocco.
The quarter-finals saw them beat Australia 1–0, and in the semi-final against Paraguay, Iraq lost 3–1. In the bronze medal match, Iraq lost 1–0 to Italy and finished fourth.

2016 Rio Olympics

Iraq qualified for the 2016 Olympics by clinching third place at the 2016 AFC U-23 Championship. The first game saw Iraq play against Denmark, and the score turned out as a 0–0 draw, despite Iraq having 18 shots in the match. The second game was played against the hosts and pre-tournament favourites, Brazil, which also ended up as a 0–0 draw, which was hailed as a great result for Iraq. In the third game, Iraq tied South Africa 1–1, despite having a huge 29 shots in the match. This result, coupled with Denmark's defeat to Brazil, saw Iraq get eliminated at the group stage. Brazil eventually went on to win the tournament.

AFC U-23 Asian Cup

2013 AFC U-22 Championship
Iraq's first major honour on U-23 level was the 2013 AFC U-22 Championship. The tournament started with a 3–1 win against Saudi Arabia. That was followed by a 2–1 win against Uzbekistan and a 1–0 win against China. The quarter-finals saw them beat Japan 1–0, and the semi-final against favourites Korea Republic with another 1–0 win.

The final was against local rivals Saudi Arabia, and Mohannad Abdul-Raheem scored the only goal to win the tournament for Iraq. This victory secured Iraq's first Asian Cup U-23 title.

2016 AFC U-23 Championship
The 2016 AFC U-23 Championship final tournament is to be held in Qatar from 12–30 January 2016. Iraq qualified for the tournament by topping the group in the qualification stage in Oman in March 2015.

Iraq advanced from the group stage, beating Yemen 2–0, Uzbekistan 3–2, and a 1–1 tie with South Korea. In the quarterfinals, Iraq beat UAE 3–1 in extra time to progress to the semifinals. Iraq lost 2–1 to Japan.

In the third place match, Iraq came back from behind to beat Qatar 2–1 to qualify for 2016 Olympics.

2018 AFC U-23 Championship

Iraq qualified for the 3rd tournament by topping the group in the qualification stage in Saudi Arabia in July 2017.

In the final tournament, with the defending champion Japan not bringing their strongest squad and South Korea fielded a relatively inexperienced squad, Iraq had many chances to repeat 2013 success. In the group stage, they finished at the top of the group after beating Malaysia 4–1 and Jordan 1–0, with a 0–0 draw against Saudi Arabia. Iraq advanced into the quarter-final as the first seed of group C and was scheduled to face off against Vietnam, which was widely regarded to be Iraq's easiest ever opponent in this stage, boosting the enthusiasm among Iraqis. However, thing didn't go as planned, which an unexpected 3–3 draw after extra time meant that the result would be settled via a penalty shoot-out, in which Vietnam emerged victorious with the score of 5–3, thus eliminating Iraq from the tournament in the shock of its supporters.

2020 AFC U-23 Championship

Iraq qualified for the tournament by topping the group in the qualification stage in Iran in March 2019.

In the final tournament held in Thailand, Iraq was grouped in group A together with host Thailand, a resurgence Australia and the unknown Bahrain. 
For the first time, Iraq did not make it out of the group stage, drawing all three games.

2022 AFC U-23 Asian Cup
Iraq were drawn with Jordan, Australia and Kuwait. 

Iraq pulled back the equaliser through Wakaa Ramadan to draw with Jordan 1-1 in the opening matchday, before drawing again to a 10-man Australia side through a Hasan Abdulkareem volley cancelling out a scorpion kick goal scored by Alou Kuol. Needing a win to qualify for the quarter finals, Iraq came back from a goal down to beat Kuwait 3-1 thanks to goals scored by Muntadher Mohammed, Moammel Abdulridha and Mohammed Al-Baqer. 

Iraq qualified out of Group B as runner-up, only behind Australia, so they were drawn against the winner of Group A, hosts Uzbekistan. The game went to extra time and later, penalties. Merchas Doski and Ahmed Naeem converted their penalties while Uzbekistan's second penalty was saved by Hassan Ahmed. However, Wakaa Ramadan hit the post, Moammel Abdulridha had his tame penalty saved and Hasan Abdulkareem blazed his penalty over the bar, while Uzbekistan converted their last three penalties to win 3-2 on penalties and advance to the semi finals.

Recent results and fixtures

The following is a list of match results in the last 12 months, as well as any future matches that have been scheduled.
Legend

2022

2023

Coaching staff

Players

Current squad
The following 25 players were called up for the U-23 Doha Friendly Tournament.
Caps and goals correct as of 11 June 2022 after game against Uzbekistan.

Recent call-ups
The following players have been called up since January 2021

 

PRE Part of the preliminary squad
INJ Player injured
IRQ Player moved up to the first team
OVR Player overaged and ineligible to represent this age group
WD Player withdrew for non-injury related reasons

Overage players
Football at the Summer Olympics, the Asian Games and the Islamic Solidarity Games have required that under-23 players enter the competitions, but they have allowed three overage players to be included in one squad. These three players are called the "wild cards".

Summer Olympics

Asian Games

Islamic Solidarity Games

Competitive record

Summer Olympics

AFC U-23 Asian Cup

*Draws include knockout matches decided on penalty kicks.

Asian Games

*Draws include knockout matches decided on penalty kicks.

WAFF U-23 Championship

Islamic Solidarity Games

Other tournaments

Honours
 Summer Olympics
Fourth place: 2004
 AFC U-23 Asian Cup
Winners: 2013
Third place: 2016
 Asian Games
Runners-up: 2006
Third place: 2014

See also
Iraq national football team
Iraq national under-20 football team
Iraq national under-17 football team

References

External links
Official website
Official Iraq national football team on FIFA.com

Under-23
Asian national under-23 association football teams